Wayne "Wiggy" Dover (born 30 October 1973) is a Guyanese professional football player and manager.

Career
He played for Guyana national football team.

Between 2008 and 2010 he coached the Guyana national football team. Since 2010 he is a head coach of Alpha United FC.

References

External links

Profile at Soccerpunter.com

1973 births
Living people
Guyanese footballers
Guyana international footballers
Guyanese football managers
Guyana national football team managers
Place of birth missing (living people)
Association footballers not categorized by position